Frank Benson may refer to:

Frank Benson (actor) (1858–1939), British actor-manager
Frank Weston Benson (1862–1951), American impressionist artist
Frank W. Benson (politician) (1858–1911), American politician and Governor of Oregon
Frank Benson (artist, born 1976), American sculptor and photographer
Frank Benson (footballer) (1898–1981), Irish Gaelic footballer
Frank L. Benson, attorney general of Idaho